Reber is a last name of German origin. It is derived from two sources: First, it is "an occupational name for a vine-dresser or vintner, from Middle High German rebe 'vine' + -er agent suffix." Second, it comes "from a Germanic personal name, Radobert, formed with rād, rāt 'counsel', 'advice' + berht 'bright'". In the United States, persons with the last name Reber primarily live in Pennsylvania; there are also large numbers in Ohio, California, Minnesota, Utah. Montana and Colorado.

Notable persons
Arthur S. Reber, American cognitive psychologist
Deborah Reber, American writer
Gerhard Reber, German organizational theorist
Grote Reber, astronomer
James Q. Reber, second Deputy Director of the National Reconnaissance Office
John Reber, Republican member of the U.S. House of Representatives
Joseph Bryant Reber, correspondent for the Butte Daily Post
Napoléon Henri Reber, French musician and composer
Robert Reber, Republican member of the Pennsylvania House of Representatives
Rolf Reber, professor of cognitive psychology at the University of Bergen in Norway
Stephen C. Reber, former Presiding Bishop of the United Episcopal Church of North America

Other
Reber (automobile), an early American motor car manufacturer

References 

Surnames